Premikulu  is a 2005 Indian Telugu-language romantic drama film directed by B. Jaya and starring Yuvaraj and Kamna Jethmalani.

Plot
Chandu and Vennela fall in love against their parents' wishes, so they jump from the top of a building. They both lose their memory of each other. How they reunite forms the rest of the plot.

Cast 

Yuvaraj as Chandu 
Kamna Jethmalani as Vennela
Rishi Girish 
Rajiv Kanakala  
Abhinaya Krishna
 Phani
 Manu
Sana
Ahuti Prasad as Chandu's father
Rambabu 
Brahmanandam
Venu Madhav
Lakshmipati
Kallu Chidambaram
Sai Suresh
TP Gopal
Viswanath Reddy
Suribabu
Sudhakar
Rajyalakshmi
Suma Kanakala
Sheela Singh 
Abhinayashree (item number)

Production 
The film is produced by magazine editor BA Raju, who also produced the films Premalo Pavani Kalyan (2002) and Chantigadu (2003; also directed by Jaya). The film began production in January of 2005. Newcomer Yuvaraj, a Telugu guy from Mumbai, and Kamna Jethmalani made their debut with this film. Kamna Jethmalani was cast in the film after director Jaya convinced Jethmalani's parents to let her star in the film. The music is composed by Raveendran's son, Sajan.

Soundtrack 
The music was composed by Sajan Madhav. The audio rights were bagged by Aditya Music.

Reception
Jeevi of Idlebrain.com wrote that "On a whole, Premikulu - made with a novel point - does not live it up". A critic from Rediff.com wrote that "Despite choosing a plot with some potential (lovers failing to identify themselves due to amnesia), she [Jaya] is unable to hold an audience with interesting narration, relying on clichéd comedy instead". A critic from Full Hyderabad wrote that "Eminently worth a miss, and if it's the songs you want to watch it for, there are always the cassettes and CDs".

References